The Golden State Athletic Conference (GSAC) is a college athletic conference affiliated with the National Association of Intercollegiate Athletics (NAIA). The conference commissioner is Mike Daniels. Conference leadership is shared among the member institutions. Nine of the ten members of the GSAC are Christian colleges located in California and Arizona. Conference teams have won 22 national championships.

History

The Golden State Athletic Conference was formed in the fall of 1986, with Azusa Pacific University, California Lutheran University, Fresno Pacific University, Point Loma Nazarene University, Vanguard University and Westmont College as the charter members. California Baptist University and Concordia University joined the GSAC in the fall of the following year (1987). Cal Lutheran left the GSAC after the spring of 1989. Biola University joined the GSAC in the fall of 1994. Hope International University and San Diego Christian College joined the GSAC in the fall of 1999. The Master's University, joined the GSAC in the fall of 2001. Lewis–Clark State College of Lewiston, Idaho joined the GSAC as an affiliate member for men's and women's tennis in 2016.

Recent years
In recent years, the conference has seen changes with members leaving the GSAC and the NAIA for the NCAA. In 2011 Cal Baptist left the GSAC to join the Pacific West Conference followed by the announcement that Azusa Pacific, Fresno Pacific and Point Loma Nazarene joined Cal Baptist in the PacWest in 2012.  Concordia then left to join the PacWest in 2015, and Biola applied to make the same move in 2017.  To replace these schools, the GSAC has added Arizona Christian, Menlo and William Jessup (now known as Jessup). Life Pacific joined in 2017 and Ottawa (AZ) joined in 2018 to bring the GSAC to 10 members.

Chronological timeline
 1986 – The Golden State Athletic Conference (GSAC) was founded. Charter members included Azusa Pacific University, California Lutheran University (a.k.a. Cal Lutheran), Fresno Pacific College (now Fresno Pacific University), Point Loma Nazarene College (now Point Loma Nazarene University), Southern California College (now Vanguard University of Southern California) and Westmont College, beginning the 1986–87 academic year.
 1987 – California Baptist College (now California Baptist University; a.k.a. Cal Baptist) and Christ College Irvine (now Concordia University Irvine) joined the GSAC in the 1987–88 academic year.
 1989 – Cal Lutheran left the GSAC to become an independent (before joining the Division III ranks of the National Collegiate Athletic Association (NCAA) and the Southern California Intercollegiate Athletic Conference (SCIAC) beginning the 1991–92 academic year) after the 1988–89 academic year.
 1994 – Biola University joined the GSAC in the 1994–95 academic year.
 1999 – Pacific Christian College (now Hope International University) and San Diego Christian College joined the GSAC in the 1999–2000 academic year.
 2001 – The Master's College (now The Master's University) joined the GSAC in the 2001–02 academic year.
 2011 – Cal Baptist left the GSAC and the NAIA to join the NCAA Division II ranks and the Pacific West Conference (PacWest) after the 2010–11 academic year.
 2012 – Azusa Pacific, Fresno Pacific and Point Loma Nazarene left the GSAC and the NAIA to join the NCAA Division II ranks and the PacWest after the 2011–12 academic year.
 2012 – Arizona Christian University joined the GSAC in the 2012–13 academic year.
 2014 – William Jessup University (now Jessup University) joined the GSAC in the 2012–13 academic year.
 2015 – Concordia–Irvine left the GSAC and the NAIA to join the NCAA Division II ranks and the PacWest after the 2014–15 academic year.
 2015 – Menlo College joined the GSAC in the 2015–16 academic year.
 2015 – Lewis–Clark State College joined the GSAC as an affiliate member for men's and women's tennis in the 2016 spring season (2015–16 academic year).
 2017 – Biola left the GSAC and the NAIA to join the NCAA Division II ranks and the PacWest after the 2016–17 academic year.
 2017 – Lewis–Clark State left the GSAC as an affiliate member for men's and women's tennis after the 2017 spring season (2016–17 academic year).
 2017 – Life Pacific College (now Life Pacific University) joined the GSAC in the 2017–18 academic year.
 2018 – Ottawa University–Arizona joined the GSAC in the 2018–19 academic year.
 2022 – Westmont announced that it will move to the NCAA Division II ranks and join the PacWest beginning the 2023–24 academic year.
 2022 – Menlo announced that it will move to the NCAA Division II ranks and join the PacWest, pending approval will be effective beginning the 2024–25 academic year.
 2023 – Jessup announced that it will follow Menlo into both the NCAA Division II and the PacWest, pending approval.
 2023 – Benedictine–Mesa, Embry–Riddle at Prescott, Park–Gilbert, and Saint Katherine announced their move from the California Pacific Conference to the GSAC, beginning the 2024–25 academic year.

Member schools

Current members
The GSAC currently has ten full members, all are private schools:

Notes

Future members
The GSAC will have four future full members; all are private schools:

Notes

Affiliate members
The GSAC currently has two affiliate members, both are private schools:

Notes

Former members
The GSAC had seven former full members, all were private schools:

Notes

Former affiliate members
The GSAC had two former affiliate members, one was a public school and one was a private school:

Notes

Membership timeline

Sports sponsored

References

External links

 
College sports in California
1986 establishments in California